Tugaske may refer to:
Tugaske, Saskatchewan
Tugaske (crater), a crater on Mars named after the town